Mathias Jensen (born 1 January 1996) is a Danish professional footballer who plays as a midfielder for  club Brentford and the Denmark national team.

Jensen is a product of the Nordsjælland academy and began his senior career with the club in 2016. Following two seasons as a regular member of the team, he transferred to Celta Vigo in 2018. After an injury-hit 2018–19 season, he transferred to Brentford and was a part of the squad which was promoted to the Premier League in 2021. A former Denmark youth international, Jensen made his full international debut in 2020.

Club career

Nordsjælland
A midfielder, Jensen progressed through the academy at Nordsjælland and signed a three-year professional contract in January 2015. He was promoted into the first team squad for the 2015–16 season and made five appearances during the campaign, scoring one goal, which came in a 2–2 draw with Randers on 1 May 2016. Jensen was a regular in the 2016–17 season, making 22 appearances, before 2017–18 proved to be his breakthrough season. He made 36 appearances, scored 12 goals, was awarded the captaincy and his achievements were recognised by the DBU and his club, with the DBU 2017 Talent of the Year and FC Nordsjælland Player of the Year awards respectively. After three early 2018–19-season appearances, Jensen departed Nordsjælland in August 2018. During just over three seasons as a professional at Farum Park, Jensen made 66 appearances and scored 15 goals.

Celta Vigo
On 8 August 2018, Jensen moved to Spain joining La Liga club Celta Vigo on a five-year contract. During an injury-affected 2018–19 season, he made just six appearances and left the club in July 2019.

Brentford
On 10 July 2019, Jensen moved to England signing with Championship club Brentford on a four-year contract, with the option of an additional year, for an undisclosed fee, reported to be £3.5 million. He made 43 appearances and scored one goal during the 2019–20 season, which ended with defeat in the 2020 Championship play-off Final. Jensen made a career high 53 appearances during the 2020–21 season and celebrated promotion to the Premier League with victory in the 2021 Championship play-off Final.

As a result of suffering a "badly gashed" foot while away on international duty, Jensen missed Brentford's entire 2021–22 pre-season and the first three matches of the regular season. Restricted to a mix of starting and substitute roles, Jensen made 35 appearances during a "stop-start" season. Despite being affected by COVID-19 and another minor injury, Jensen won praise from head coach Thomas Frank for training "like an animal" while sidelined.

Entering the final year of his contract, Jensen hired his own personal trainer to work with him daily during the off-season in Denmark and he returned for the 2022–23 pre-season "in incredible shape". He was challenged by head coach Thomas Frank to be the replacement for the departed Christian Eriksen. Jensen began the 2022–23 season in a starting role and as a regular set piece taker. Coaching from specialist throw-in coach Thomas Gronnemark helped length his throws. Jensen's performance and first Premier League goal in a 4–0 win over Manchester United on 13 August 2022 was recognised with the man of the match award. On 18 January 2022, Jensen signed a new -year contract, with the option of a further year. Head coach Thomas Frank commended Jensen's "pressing abilities", "his defensive mindset" and stated that "he has been one of our best players so far this season".

International career
Jensen made 30 appearances and scored 3 goals for Denmark between U18 and U21 level. He was a part of Denmark's squads at the 2017 and 2019 European U21 Championships. Jensen was named in the senior team's preliminary 35-man squad for the 2018 World Cup, but he was not included in the final squad. In October 2020, Jensen won a late call-up to the full Denmark squad for a series of three matches, as a replacement for injured Brentford teammate Christian Nørgaard. He made his full international debut with a start in a 4–0 friendly win over the Faroe Islands on 7 October and scored his first full international goal on his fifth cap, in a 8–0 2022 World Cup qualifying win over Moldova on 28 March 2021.

Jensen was named in the Denmark squad for Euro 2020 and he appeared as a substitute in each of the six matches during the Danes' run to the semi-final. Jensen was named in Denmark's 2022 World Cup squad and made two appearances prior to the team's group stage exit.

Style of play 
Jensen has been described as a "player who can dictate the game", "has a great passing ability" and "a great football brain". Midway through the 2022–23 season, he remarked that while he has "always been a technical player who doesn't really enjoy the big tackles", he had developed his "aggression" and "adapted to the tempo of the Premier League".

Personal life 
Jensen is a Manchester United and Barcelona supporter.

Career statistics

Club

International 

Scores and results list Denmark's goal tally first, score column indicates score after each Jensen goal.

Honours
Brentford
EFL Championship play-offs: 2021

Individual
Danish Talent of the Year: 2017
FC Nordsjælland Player of the Year: 2017–18

References

External links

Mathias Jensen at brentfordfc.com

1996 births
Living people
Danish men's footballers
Denmark youth international footballers
Denmark under-21 international footballers
Denmark international footballers
Association football midfielders
FC Nordsjælland players
RC Celta de Vigo players
Brentford F.C. players
Danish Superliga players
La Liga players
English Football League players
UEFA Euro 2020 players
2022 FIFA World Cup players
Danish expatriate men's footballers
Expatriate footballers in England
Expatriate footballers in Spain
Danish expatriate sportspeople in England
Danish expatriate sportspeople in Spain
Premier League players